Pademelons are small, furry, hopping mammals in the genus Thylogale, found in Australia and New Guinea. They are some of the smallest members of the macropod family (Macropodidae), which includes the similar-looking but larger kangaroos and wallabies. Pademelons are distinguished by their small size and their short, thick, and sparsely-haired tails. Like other marsupials, they carry their young in a pouch.

The word "pademelon" comes from the word badimaliyan in Dharug, an Aboriginal language spoken near what is now Sydney, Australia. The scientific name Thylogale uses  the Greek words for "pouch" and "weasel."

Species

Distribution and habitat
Red-legged pademelons can be found in the coastal regions of Queensland and New South Wales, and in south-central New Guinea. In some areas, their range has been drastically reduced. 

The red-bellied or Tasmanian pademelon is abundant in Tasmania, although it was once found throughout the southeastern parts of mainland Australia. 

The dusky pademelon lives in New Guinea and surrounding islands. It was previously called the Aru Islands wallaby. Before that, it was called the philander ("friend of man"), which is the name it bears in the second volume of Cornelis de Bruijn's Travels, originally published in 1711; the Latin name of this species is called after De Bruijn.

The natural habitat of the pademelon is in thick scrubland or dense forested undergrowth. They also make tunnels through long grasses and bushes in swampy country.

Threats
Pademelon meat used to be considered valuable and was eaten by settlers and Aboriginals.

Aside from being killed for their meat and soft fur, their numbers have been reduced by the introduction of non-native predators such as feral cats, feral dogs, and red foxes. The rabbit explosion has also caused problems as rabbits graze on the same grasses, making less available for the pademelons. Clearing of land for urbanisation has pushed the larger wallabies and kangaroos onto land that previously was occupied by pademelons with little competition.

Tasmanian pademelons were important to the thylacines' diet, and they are still preyed on by quolls, Tasmanian devils, and wedge-tailed eagles. Despite these predators, Tasmania and its outlying smaller islands have large numbers of pademelons and every year many are culled to keep their numbers sustainable.

References

External links

Macropods
Taxa named by John Edward Gray
Marsupials of Australia